Ingrid Mcleod (born 23 December 1967) is a former Lok Sabha member who represented India's Anglo-Indian community. She is from Bilaspur. She started her career as a teacher and social worker. She was nominated to Chhattisgarh assembly for nearly two-and-half years by the then-chief minister Ajit Jogi before being nominated to Lok Sabha in 2004. Mcleod is an active member of the Indian National Congress. She has been compared to Sonia Gandhi because of her looks.

References

Chhattisgarh MLAs 2000–2003
Living people
1967 births
India MPs 2004–2009
People from Bilaspur, Chhattisgarh
Nominated members of the Lok Sabha
Indian National Congress politicians from Chhattisgarh
Anglo-Indian people
India MPs 2009–2014